St. Mary's Episcopal Cathedral can refer to 
St. Mary's Cathedral, Glasgow
St Mary's Cathedral, Edinburgh (Episcopal)
St. Mary's Episcopal Cathedral (Memphis, Tennessee)